Damirangiin Baatarjav (born 25 August 1943) is a Mongolian judoka. He competed in the men's half-middleweight event at the 1972 Summer Olympics.

References

1943 births
Living people
Mongolian male judoka
Olympic judoka of Mongolia
Judoka at the 1972 Summer Olympics
Place of birth missing (living people)